Murray Patrick Watt (born 20 January 1973) is an Australian politician who has served as Minister for Agriculture, Fisheries and Forestry in the Albanese government since June 2022. He is a member of the Australian Labor Party (ALP) and has been a Senator for Queensland since the 2016 federal election. He previously served in the Queensland Legislative Assembly from 2009 to 2012.

Early life
Watt was born in Brisbane on 20 January 1973. His parents were both schoolteachers from working-class backgrounds. He grew up in Brisbane's southern suburbs.

Watt was educated at Brisbane State High School where he was school captain in 1989. In 1996, he graduated from the University of Queensland with the degrees of Bachelor of Commerce and Bachelor of Laws. He practised as a solicitor from 1997 to 2002 and was a judge's associate from 1999 to 2000. He was then a public servant in the Queensland Department of Premier and Cabinet and the Department of State Development from 2007 to 2009, and chief of staff to Anna Bligh from 2002 to 2007, and again in 2008. He had long been active in the Australian Labor Party, serving as president of Queensland Young Labor in 1998 and delegate to various state conferences.

Watt was also a senior associate with the Brisbane office of the legal firm Maurice Blackburn.

State politics
In 2009, Watt was elected to the Legislative Assembly of Queensland for Everton, succeeding Rod Welford, who had retired. He was defeated at the 2012 state election.

When Meaghan Scanlon was preselected as the Labor candidate for Gaven at the 2017 state election, it was claimed that Watt was the deciding factor and that it was against the wishes of the branch members. One member of the branch claimed "factional politics prior to Murray coming to the Gold Coast didn't happen".

Federal politics
Following the retirement of Senator Jan McLucas in 2015, Watt was endorsed by the Labor Party as a Senate candidate for Queensland at the 2016 federal election and was subsequently elected.

After the 2019 election, Watt was included in Anthony Albanese's shadow ministry as Shadow Minister for Northern Australia and Shadow Minister for Disaster and Emergency Management. In 2021 he was also appointed to the role of Shadow Minister for Queensland Resources. He is also Deputy Opposition Whip in the Senate.

Watt is a member of Labor Left.

Re-elected at the 2022 election, Watt became Minister for Agriculture, Fisheries and Forestry and Minister for Emergency Management.

References

 

 

1973 births
Living people
Members of the Queensland Legislative Assembly
People educated at Brisbane State High School
Australian Labor Party members of the Parliament of Queensland
University of Queensland alumni
Australian Labor Party members of the Parliament of Australia
Members of the Australian Senate
Members of the Australian Senate for Queensland
21st-century Australian politicians
Labor Left politicians
Albanese Government